Mary Jean Heriot Powell (12 December 1907 – 1 April 2001), better known by her stage name Jean Anderson, was an English actress best remembered for her television roles as hard-faced matriarch Mary Hammond in the BBC drama The Brothers (1972–1976) and as rebellious aristocrat Lady Jocelyn "Joss" Holbrook in the Second World War series Tenko (1982–1985). She also had a distinguished career on stage and appeared in 46 films.

Early life and stage
Anderson was born on 12 December 1907 in Eastbourne, Sussex to Scottish parents, and grew up in Guildford, Surrey. She trained at the Royal Academy of Dramatic Art from 1926-1928. Her first professional engagement was in Many Waters at the Prince's Theatre, Bristol, in 1929 with her fellow RADA student Robert Morley.

In 1934 she joined the Cambridge Festival Theatre, appearing in The Circle by Somerset Maugham and Yahoo by Lord Longford. In 1935 she played Lady Macbeth with The Seagull Players in Leeds.

In 1936 Lord Longford's company from the Gate Theatre, Dublin were appearing at the Westminster Theatre in London. Anderson joined them to appear in Ah, Wilderness! and stayed on for the rest of their season, including Carmilla, The Moon in the Yellow River,  Youth’s the Season . . . ? and Yahoo. When the company returned to Dublin she went with them and appeared regularly at the Gate Theatre for three years. Among many notable productions were As You Like It, The Duchess of Malfi,  The Cherry Orchard and Doctor Faustus.

John Cowell wrote:

Jean Anderson, with her fascinating voice and medieval good looks, became a tower of strength in Longford Productions... As Longford’s first leading lady, she brought a new and fresh charm to every role. Her Rosalind in As You Like It caught the scent of the musk-rose in the hidden places of the Forest of Arden.

When Anderson returned to London in 1940 she joined the staff of the Players’ Theatre Club, which was a popular refuge from the war. When the director Leonard Sachs was called up for service, Anderson took over running the club and kept it going for the duration.

Her acting career resumed after the war with 1066 and All That, Don Juan in Hell, The Apple Cart and The Moon in the Yellow River with Jack Hawkins. At this point the focus of her work swung to television and film. But she continued to appear on stage in notable productions, such as Pirandello’s Six Characters in Search of an Author directed by Dame Ngaio Marsh, Hedda Gabler, an all-star Uncle Vanya at Hampstead Theatre, and Les Liaisons Dangereuses with Alan Rickman and the Royal Shakespeare Company in London and also on Broadway. Her last stage work was in Terence Rattigan’s Harlequinade in 1988.

Television
Her first appearance on television was in Weep for the Cyclops on BBC in 1947. 

Other TV credits include: Police Surgeon, Maigret, The Odd Man, The Man in Room 17, The Borderers, Paul Temple, Codename, Oil Strike North, Miss Marple, Inspector Morse, Campion, Rab C. Nesbitt, Keeping Up Appearances and Hetty Wainthropp Investigates. She also played the role of the Mother in The Railway Children in two separate BBC adaptations in 1951 and 1957.

She reprised her role in the play The Moon in the Yellow River BBC 1953. Her last television work was in Keeping Mum in 1998 on BBC.

Filmography

 The Mark of Cain (1947) - Extra (uncredited)
 Bond Street (1948) - Dress Shop Assistant (uncredited)
 Elizabeth of Ladymead (1948)
 The Romantic Age (1949) - Miss Sankey (uncredited)
 Seven Days to Noon (1950) - Mother at Railway Station (uncredited)
 Out of True (1951) - Dr. Bell
 The Franchise Affair (1951) - Miss Tuff
 Life in Her Hands (1951) - Night Sister
 White Corridors (1951) - Sister Gater
 High Treason (1951) - Woman in Street (uncredited)
 The Brave Don't Cry (1952) - Mrs. Sloan
 Time Bomb (1953) - Matron (uncredited)
 Street Corner (1953) - Miss Haversham - Store Detective
 Johnny on the Run (1953) - Mrs. MacIntyre
 The Kidnappers (1953) - Grandma MacKenzie
 The Pleasure Garden (1953) - Aunt Minerva
 The Weak and the Wicked (1954) - Policewoman in Court (uncredited)
 Lease of Life (1954) - Miss Calthorp
 Laughing in the Sunshine (1956) - Diana Masefield
 The Secret Tent (1956) - Mrs. Martyn
 A Town Like Alice (1956) - Miss Horsefall
 The Barretts of Wimpole Street (1957) - Wilson
 Lucky Jim (1957) - Mrs. Welch
 Robbery Under Arms (1957) - Ma Marston
 Heart of a Child (1958) - Maria
 A Night to Remember (1958) - Stuffy Lady in Lifeboat (uncredited)
 SOS Pacific (1959) - Miss Shaw
 Solomon and Sheba (1959) - Takyan
 Spare the Rod (1961) - Mrs. Pond
 Little Girls Never Cry (1962) - Aunt Kate
 Waltz of the Toreadors (1962) - Agnes
 The Inspector (1962) - Mrs. Jongman
 The Three Lives of Thomasina (1963) - Mrs. MacKenzie
 The Silent Playground (1963) - Mrs. Lacey
 Half a Sixpence (1967) - Lady Botting
 Country Dance (1970) - Matron
 The Night Digger (1971) - Mrs. Millicent McMurtrey
 Dear Parents (1973)
 The Lady Vanishes (1979) - Baroness
 Screamtime (1983) - Mildred
 Madame Sousatzka (1988) - Lady with Removal Men
 Leon the Pig Farmer (1992) - Mrs. Samuels
 Simon Magus (1999) - Roise
 The Harpist (1999) - Mrs. Merz
 Endgame (2000) - Nell

Her last role was in Conor McPherson’s film of Samuel Beckett’s Endgame, shot in Dublin just a few months before her death.

Personal life and death
In 1934 she married Peter Powell, who directed her in many plays over the years. They divorced in 1949. They had a daughter, Aude, who became an agent.

She had a London home in Barnes, and in her later years moved to Eden Valley in the north-west of England near her daughter. Her interests were collecting porcelain figurines and horse racing.

She was the subject of This Is Your Life in 1985 when she was surprised by Eamonn Andrews.

Anderson died in 2001, aged 93.

References

External links

Jean Anderson at the British Film Institute

People from Eastbourne
1907 births
2001 deaths
English film actresses
English people of Scottish descent
English television actresses
Actresses from Sussex
20th-century English actresses